Battle of Shirimni also known as the Battle of Palakazio was fought between the Byzantine and Georgian armies at the place of Shirimni at the Palakazio Lake (now Childir, Turkey; then part of Georgia) on September 11, 1021.

Background
The battle was preceded by the two-decade-long dispute over the Georgian courapalates’ succession that included several Byzantine-Georgian-Armenian marchlands in Asia Minor. A full-scale war erupted when the Georgian king George I took the disputed areas by force, 1014. In retaliation the Byzantine emperor Basil II led, in 1021, a large army into Georgia pushing the Georgians back to their inner frontiers.

Battle
Both Byzantine and Georgian armies were led by the monarchs themselves. Basil’s army included many Varangian Guards while George was reinforced by Armenian auxiliaries. The two armies met at a village Shirimni at the Palakazio Lake. The Georgians were close to winning the battle, but powerful counterattacks by Basil proved to be decisive. Two Georgian high-ranking generals, Rati Baghvashi and Khursi were killed in action. Following this costly victory, the emperor plundered the nearby lands and returned to his dominions to winter at Trapezius.

See also
 Byzantine-Georgian wars
 Battle of Svindax

References 

  René Grousset, L'Empire du Levant : Histoire de la Question d'Orient, Paris, Payot, coll. « Bibliothèque historique », 1949 (réimpr. 1979), 648 p., p. 153

Shirimni
Shirimni
1020s in the Byzantine Empire
Conflicts in 1021
Battles of Basil II
Byzantine–Georgian wars
1021 in Asia
1021 in Europe
11th century in the Kingdom of Georgia